Rebecca Gayle Feeney Doherty (born June 3, 1952) is a former United States district judge of the United States District Court for the Western District of Louisiana.

Education and career

Born Rebecca Gayle Feeney in Fort Worth, Texas, Doherty in 1973 received a Bachelor of Arts degree from Northwestern State University in Natchitoches, Louisiana. Two years later, she procured a Master of Arts from the same institution. In 1981, she obtained a Juris Doctor from the Louisiana State University Law Center in Baton Rouge. From 1981 to 1991, she was in private practice in Lafayette, Louisiana.

Federal judicial service

On June 27, 1991, Doherty was nominated by President George H. W. Bush to a new seat on the United States District Court for the Western District of Louisiana created by 104 Stat. 5089. She was confirmed by the United States Senate on October 31, 1991, and received her commission on November 5, 1991. She assumed senior status on June 5, 2017 and retired on May 1, 2020.

Law clerk

One of her former law clerks is Royal Alexander, an attorney and Republican politician from Shreveport, Louisiana.

References

Sources
 

1952 births
Living people
Judges of the United States District Court for the Western District of Louisiana
United States district court judges appointed by George H. W. Bush
20th-century American judges
People from Fort Worth, Texas
People from Lafayette, Louisiana
Louisiana Republicans
Northwestern State University alumni
Louisiana State University Law Center alumni
21st-century American judges
20th-century American women judges
21st-century American women judges